Mikro is a genus of sea snails, marine gastropod mollusks in the family Skeneidae.

Species
Species within the genus Mikro include:
 Mikro cerion (Dall, 1927)
 Mikro giustii (Bogi & Nofroni, 1989)
 Mikro globulus Warén, 1996
 Mikro hattonensis Hoffman, Van Heugten & Lavaleye, 2010
 Mikro minimus (Seguenza G., 1876)
 Mikro oviceps Ortega & Gofas, 2019
 Mikro perforatus Hoffman, Gofas & Freiwald, 2020
 Mikro scalaroides (Rubio & Rolán, 2013)
Species brought into synonymy
 Mikro minima (Seguenza G., 1876): synonym of Mikro minimus (Seguenza G., 1876) (wrong gender agreement of specific epithet)
 Mikro perforata Hoffman, Gofas & Freiwald, 2020: synonym of Mikro perforatus Hoffman, Gofas & Freiwald, 2020 (wrong gender agreement of specific epithet)

References

 Warén A. (1996). New and little known mollusca from Iceland and Scandinavia. Part 3. Sarsia 81: 197-245
 Gofas, S.; Le Renard, J.; Bouchet, P. (2001). Mollusca, in: Costello, M.J. et al. (Ed.) (2001). European register of marine species: a check-list of the marine species in Europe and a bibliography of guides to their identification. Collection Patrimoines Naturels, 50: pp. 180–213

External links
  Serge GOFAS, Ángel A. LUQUE, Joan Daniel OLIVER,José TEMPLADO & Alberto SERRA (2021) - The Mollusca of Galicia Bank (NE Atlantic Ocean); European Journal of Taxonomy 785: 1–114

 
Skeneidae
Gastropod genera